Irma Eugenia Aguilar Morales (born July 13, 1957) is a Mexican former professional wrestler, most commonly known under the ring name Irma Aguilar. She is the daughter of Irma González, a pioneer of women's professional wrestling in Mexico. Her career start in 1975, with her last known match taking place in 1997.

Aguilar was the first holder of the Mexican National Women's Tag Team Championship alongside her mother, as well as the first Distrito Federal Women's Champion, and held the UWA World Women's Championship. She has also won several high-profile Lucha de Apuestas, or hair vs. hair matches, leaving Rossy Moreno, Martha Villalobos, and Lola González, among others, bald as a result of their matches.

Championships and accomplishments
Empresa Mexicana de Lucha Libre
Distrito Federal Women's Championship (1 time)
Mexican National Women's Tag Team Championship (1 time, first)  with Irma González)
Universal Wrestling Association
UWA World Women's Championship (1 time)

Luchas de Apuestas record

References

1959 births
Living people
20th-century professional wrestlers
Mexican female professional wrestlers
People from Ciudad Juárez
Sportspeople from Chihuahua (state)
21st-century professional wrestlers
Mexican National Women's Champions
Mexican National Women's Tag Team Champions